The Battle of Velika Hoča between the Serbian Chetnik Organization, a Serbian rebel faction, and Ottoman irregulars from Orahovac, took place on 25 May 1905.

Prelude
The Battle of Čelopek (16 April 1905), fought between 120 Serbian guerillas and Ottoman officers accompanied by Ottoman Albanian bashi-bozuks, ended in a great victory after the guerillas managed to overtake three peaks; the Ottomans had over 200 dead and wounded, while the guerrillas only had 2 dead. The victory enraged the Ottomans, who began manhunting the rebels. The rebels were forced to retreat across the border, and the bands were subsequently dispersed. The bands intended to cross Ibarski Kolašin, Prizrenska Gora, Šar Mountains and Suva Planina to their respective areas. The journey of Lazar Kujundžić's band proved catastrophic.

Battle
A group of seven fighters, led by vojvoda Lazar Kujundžić, vojvoda Savatije Milošević and sub-lieutenant Živojin Milovanović, arrived at night-time  at the village of Velika Hoča near Prizren. This group returned to the field having crossed Kuršumlija, Podujevo, Ibarski Kolašin and Podrima. The group's leader, teacher Kujundžić, excellently knew the customs and language of the Albanians. Velika Hoča was a Serbian village with only two Albanian tower houses (kule). In order to prevent revenge of the Albanians on the Velika Hoča Serbs, Kujundžić chose to pay tribute to one of the Albanian houses, whose host gave him his word (besa).

As the Chetniks had supper and fell asleep, the Albanian notified the Albanians of nearby Orahovac. A mob of 1,500 Albanians, and some Ottoman soldiers, surrounded the house. The Ottoman yuzbashi (captain) called for the Chetniks to give themselves up, to which the Chetniks answered with a bullet hail, killing the captain and four askeri. The fusillade continued over the day, until dusk, when a group of Albanians broke into the lower floor, which, as in all kule, was the stable for cattle. They shot through the ceiling, managing to kill five of the Chetniks, then set the house on fire. The remaining two jumped out of the house shooting, but were instantly killed. According to documents of the Consulate in Pristina, more than 40 Albanians and Ottoman soldiers died during the fight.

Aftermath and legacy
The Ottomans brought Jadranka, the mother of Kujundžić, to recognize his body. She replied that her son was a daskal (teacher), and no kaçak (outlaw), and that the body was somebody else. Inspired by this event, count Ivo Vojnović wrote a drama in verse, Lazarevo Vaskrsenje ("Lazar's Resurrection"). Serbian major and Chetnik vojvoda Božin Simić cited that Kujundžić's mother's words were: "No, that is not my son. I was unlucky to have not given birth to such a hero." (Ne to nije moj sin. Ja nisam imala sreću da rodim takvog junaka). Serbian major Milosav Jelić, a journalist and Chetnik, published the poem Kujundžića majka ("Kujundžić's Mother") in the collection of Srbijanski venac.

Serbian history books about the Serbian Chetnik Organization call the group heroes.

See also
Battle of Tabanovce (1905)
Battle of Čelopek (1905)
Battle of Čelopek (1906)

Annotations

References

Sources

 

Velika Hoča
1905 in the Ottoman Empire
1905 in Serbia
Conflicts in 1905
Chetniks of the Macedonian Struggle
May 1905 events